Cape Anna is a prominent black cape rising to 280 m, immediately west of Anna Cove, located 1 mile (1.6 km) west of Louise Island and the entrance to Hugershoff Cove, and 2.3 miles (3.7 km) northeast of Mount Fourcade, and forming the north tip of Arctowski Peninsula on the west coast of Graham Land. Discovered by the Belgian Antarctic Expedition, 1897–99, and named after Mme. Ernest (Anna) Osterrieth, who gave financial assistance to the expedition.

See also
Gerlache Strait Geology

Headlands of Graham Land
Danco Coast